The following list of Americans in the Venona papers is a list of names deciphered from codenames contained in the Venona project, an American government effort from 1943–1980 to decrypt coded messages by intelligence forces of the Soviet Union. To what extent some of the individuals named in the Venona papers were actually involved with Soviet intelligence is a topic of dispute.

The following list of individuals is extracted in large part from the work of historians John Earl Haynes and Harvey Klehr and reflects their previous points of view. However, Haynes' positions on the meaning and correct identification of names on the list continues to evolve.

Non-Americans may also be mentioned in passing.

Notes and disclaimers on the list

Names marked with a double asterisk (**) do not appear in the Venona documents. Inclusion has been inferred to correlate with codenames or similarly spelled names found in the documents.

Similarly, identities that have been inferred by researchers (i.e., the name appears in the Venona documents, but positive identification of the individual bearing that name does not), are also marked with a double asterisk (**).

List
 John Abt, attorney and politician**
 Solomon Adler, economist**
 Rudy Baker, politician**
 Joel Barr, engineer
 Alice Barrows, educator
 Theodore Bayer, President, Russky Golos Publishing
 Cedric Belfrage, journalist
 Elizabeth Bentley, teacher and politician
 Joseph Milton Bernstein
 Earl Browder, American communist and General Secretary of the Communist Party USA from 1934 to 1945.
 Paul Burns**
 Sylvia Callen**
 Virginius Frank Coe
 Lona Cohen**
 Morris Cohen**, Communist Party USA & Portland Spy Ring member who was courier for Manhattan Project physicist Theodore Hall.
 Judith Coplon, Department of Justice employee
 Lauchlin Currie, White House economic adviser to President Franklin Roosevelt and director of World Bank mission to Colombia.
 Byron T. Darling**
 William Dawson, United States Ambassador to Uruguay
 Eugene Dennis, politician and labor organizer
 Samuel Dickstein, politician and judge**
 Martha Dodd**, daughter of William Dodd, who served as the United States ambassador to Germany between 1933 and 1937.
 William E. Dodd, Jr., educator; son of William Dodd and brother of Martha Dodd
 Laurence Duggan, head of the South American desk at the United States Department of State during World War II.
 Eufrosina Dvoichenko-Markov
 Nathan Einhorn
 Jack Bradley Fahy
 Linn Markley Farish, senior liaison officer with Josip Broz Tito's Yugoslav Partisan forces
 Edward J. Fitzgerald
 Charles Flato
 Isaac Folkoff
 Jane Foster
 Zalmond David Franklin
 Isabel Gallardo
 Boleslaw K. Gerbert
 Rebecca Getzoff
 Harold Glasser, U.S. Treasury Dept. economist, United Nations Relief and Rehabilitation Administration (UNRRA) spokesman.
 Bela Gold
 Harry Gold, sentenced to 30 years for his role in the Rosenbergs' ring
 Sonia Steinman Gold
 Jacob Golos, "main pillar" of NKVD spy network, particularly the Sound/Myrna group, he died in the arms of Elizabeth Bentley
 George Gorchoff
 Gerald Graze**
 David Greenglass, machinist at Los Alamos sentenced to 15 years for his role in Rosenberg ring; he was the brother of executed Ethel Rosenberg
 Ruth Greenglass
 Theodore Alvin Hall, Manhattan Project physicist who gave plutonium purification secrets to Soviet intelligence.
 Maurice Halperin, American writer, professor, diplomat, and Soviet spy (NKVD code name "Hare").
 Kitty Harris
 Clarence Hiskey**
 Cary Hiles
 Alger Hiss, Lawyer involved in the establishment of the United Nations, both as a U.S. State Department and UN official.
 Donald Hiss**
 Harry Hopkins, One of FDR's closest advisers & New Deal architect, esp. Works Progress Administration (WPA); as a diplomat in charge of relations between FDR and Stalin his name naturally appears on the list.
 Louis Horwitz
 Bella Joseph**
 Emma Harriet Joseph
 Gertrude Kahn
 Joseph Katz
 Helen Grace Scott Keenan
 Mary Jane Keeney, librarian
 Philip Keeney
 Alexander Koral**
 Helen Koral
 Samuel Krafsur
 Charles Kramer, economist
 Christina Krotkova
 Sergej Nikolaevich Kurnakov
 Fiorello La Guardia, mayor of New York City
 Stephen Laird
 Oscar Lange, economist and diplomat
 Richard Lauterbach, employee at Time magazine
 Duncan C. Lee
 Michael S. Leshing
 Helen Lowry
 William Mackey
 Harry Samuel Magdoff
 William Malisoff, owner and manager of United Laboratories
 Hede Massing**
 Robert Owen Menaker
 Floyd Cleveland Miller
 James Walter Miller
 Robert Miller**
 Robert G. Minor, Office of Strategic Services, Belgrade
 Leonard Emil Mins
 Nichola Napoli
 Franz Neumann**
 David K. Niles
 Eugénie Olkhine
 George Oppen**
 Mary Oppen**
 Frank Oppenheimer**
 Julius Robert Oppenheimer, Scientific director of the Manhattan Project and chief advisor to the U.S. Atomic Energy Commission.
 Nicholas V. Orloff
 Edna Margaret Patterson
 William Perl
 Victor Perlo
 Vladimir Aleksandrovich Posner, United States War Department
 Lee Pressman
 Mary Wolfe Price
 Bernard Redmont**
 Peter Rhodes
 Stephan Sandi Rich
 Kenneth Richardson, World Wide Electronics
 Samuel Jacob Rodman, United Nations Relief and Rehabilitation Administration
 Franklin Delano Roosevelt, President of the United States, his name appears on the list under the code name "capitan". (Winston Churchill's codename was "boar."
 Allen Rosenberg
 Julius Rosenberg, United States Army Signal Corps Laboratories, executed for role in the Rosenberg ring
 Ethel Rosenberg, executed for role in Rosenberg ring based on testimony of her brother, David Greenglass
 Amadeo Sabatini
 Alfred Epaminodas Sarant
 Marian Miloslavovich Schultz
 Milton Schwartz
 John Scott, journalist
 Ricardo Setaro
 Charles Bradford Sheppard, Hazeltine Electronics
 Abraham George Silverman
 Nathan Gregory Silvermaster, U.S. War Production Board (WPB) economist and head of a major ring of spies in the U.S. government.
 Helen Silvermaster, Leader of the American League for Peace & Democracy and the National Federation for Constitutional Liberties.
 Morton Sobell
 Jack Soble
 Robert Soble
 Johannes Steele
 I. F. Stone, Investigative journalist whose newsletter, I. F. Stone's Weekly, was ranked 16th out of 100 by his fellow journalists.
 Augustina Stridsberg
 Anna Louise Strong
 Helen Tenney**
 Mikhail Tkach, editor of the Ukrainian Daily News
 William Ludwig Ullmann
 Irving Charles Velson
 Margietta Voge
 Henry A. Wallace
 William Weisband**
 Donald Wheeler
 Maria Wicher
 Harry Dexter White, Senior U.S. Treasury department official, primary designer of the International Monetary Fund and the World Bank.
 Ruth Beverly Wilson
 Ignacy Witczak**
 Ilya Elliott Wolston
 Flora Don Wovschin
 Jones Orin York
 Daniel Abraham Zaret, Spanish War veteran
 Mark Zborovski, anthropologist

See also
 Active measures
 History of Soviet and Russian espionage in the United States
 List of Soviet agents in the United States

References
  Robert L. Benson, The Venona Story, National Security Agency, 2001.  Includes all six monographs written by Benson for each release of Venona messages.
  John Earl Haynes and Harvey Klehr (1999), Venona: Decoding Soviet Espionage in America, Yale University Press 
 Eric Hoffman (2007) A Poetry of Action: George Oppen and Communism, American Communist History, 6:1, 1–28, DOI: 10.1080/14743890701398627

Footnotes

External links
 NSA Venona site
 Selected Venona Messages
 FBI Files relating to Venona. Released in conjunction Moynihan Committee report.
 John Earl Haynes, Harvey Klehr, Venona; Decoding Soviet Espionage in America, Yale University Press, 1999. . See Yale University Press Web site information on the book.
 John Earl Haynes, "Cover Name, Cryptonym, CPUSA Party Name, Pseudonym, and Real Name Index. A Research Historian's Working Reference" (revised April 2009), on the author's web site.

 01
.Verona
Espionage in the United States
Spy rings
Cold War spies
World War II spies
World War II espionage
Venona papers